The World Para Athletics Junior Championships are a biennial Paralympic athletics event organized by World Para Athletics, a subcommittee of the International Paralympic Committee (IPC). It features athletics events contested by athletes with physical and intellectual disabilities in two age groups; under 20 and under 18. The first Championships were held in Nottwil, Switzerland in 2017, and will return there for the second edition in 2019. They are a partial Paralympic parallel to the IAAF World U20 Championships for able-bodied athletes, although both junior (under 20) and youth (under 18) events are held in the Paralympic equivalent.

Championships

All-time combined medals
As of 2019.

https://www.paralympic.org/nottwil-2019
http://www.nottwil2019.ch/en/start_list_results/
https://www.nottwil2019.ch/de/startliste_resultate/results_2017/
https://www.nottwil2019.ch/__/frontend/handler/document.php?id=166&type=42 - 2017 Medal table
https://www.nottwil2019.ch/__/frontend/handler/document/42/225/20190801-04_Medal%20Table%20combined.pdf - 2019 Medal table

2017

2019
Source:

Classification
F = field athletes
T = track athletes
P = pentathlon
11-13 – visually impaired, 11 and 12 compete with a sighted guide
20 – intellectual disability
31-38 – cerebral palsy or other conditions that affect muscle co-ordination and control. Athletes in class 31-34 compete in a seated position; athletes in class 35-38 compete standing.
40-46 – amputation, les autre
51-58 – wheelchair athletes

See also
 World Para Athletics Championships
 World Para Athletics European Championships

References

Athletics
Parasports world championships
Paraathletics
Para-athletics competitions
Recurring sporting events established in 2017
Biennial athletics competitions
Under-20 athletics competitions
Under-18 athletics competitions